Nassarius castus is a species of sea snail, a marine gastropod mollusc in the family Nassariidae, the Nassa mud snails or dog whelks.

Description
The length of the shell varies between 17 mm and 41 mm.

Distribution
This species occurs in the Red Sea, in the Indian Ocean off the Mascarene Basin and La Réunion; in the Indo-West Pacific.

References

 Cernohorsky W. O. (1984). Systematics of the family Nassariidae (Mollusca: Gastropoda). Bulletin of the Auckland Institute and Museum 14: 1–356. [details]
 Vine, P. (1986). Red Sea Invertebrates. Immel Publishing, London. 224 pp. 
 Marais J.P. & Kilburn R.N. (2010) Nassariidae. pp. 138–173, in: Marais A.P. & Seccombe A.D. (eds), Identification guide to the seashells of South Africa. Volume 1. Groenkloof: Centre for Molluscan Studies. 376 pp.

External links
 

Nassariidae
Gastropods described in 1835